The Dreamers is a play written by Jack Davis, set in Western Australia. He wrote the play to influence public opinion and bring about improvement in Aboriginal Australians' lives.

Characters 

The play features the following characters:

 Worru - an old Aboriginal man
 Dolly - Worru's niece 
 Meena - Dolly's daughter(age 14)
 Shane - Dolly's son(age 12)
 Roy - Dolly's husband 
 Eli - a cousin
 Peter - Dolly's son (age 18)
 Darren - a white boy, (age 12 approx.)

Plot  
The play is about how Aboriginal family, the Wallitches, go through everyday life. The story takes place over a period of six months in the home of the family.
 
The play maintains an elegiac tone throughout for a tribal past, for a people one physically and spiritually in harmony with their world.

Performances
It was first performed on 2 February 1982 by the Swan River Stage Company at the Dolphin Theatre in Perth. Although first performed in 1982, the play is contemporary and can be understood in a current context. The play continues to be restaged by a range of companies, particularly companies with an indigenous focus.

References

Indigenous Australian theatre
1982 plays
Plays by Jack Davis